Silencio is the second studio album from the French singer Lætitia Sadier, was released on 24 July 2012 under Drag City records.

Track listing

Personnel
Credits adapted from liner notes.

 Lætitia Sadier – voice, guitar, moog, choir, mixing
 Julien Barbagallo  – drums, percussion, choir
 Fulton Dingley  – mixing
 James Elkington –  guitar, keyboards, moog, choir, mixing, backing vocals
 Julien Gasc  – guitar, keyboards, piano, choir
 Audrey Ginestet – bass, choir, percussion
 Benjamin Glibert  – engineer, guitar, double bass
 Nick Macri  – bass, double bass 
 John McEntire – drum engineer

References

External links
 

2012 albums
Drag City (record label) albums